Ballstad is a village in Vestvågøy Municipality in Nordland county, Norway. It is located on a small island off the southwestern tip of the island of Vestvågøya in the Lofoten archipelago. It is one of the largest fishing villages in Lofoten.

Ballstad is a coastal village situated near the mouth of Buksnesfjorden, where it meets Vestfjorden.

References

Vestvågøy
Villages in Nordland
Populated places of Arctic Norway